Jesthata Padak II (Bengali: জ্যেষ্ঠতা পদক ২), is a military medal of Bangladesh. The medal is intended for awarding members of the armed forces for 20 years or more of impeccable service. JP-2 conferrable on completion of 20 yrs unblemished service career

References 

Military awards and decorations of Bangladesh